Melendy Britt (born October 31, 1943) is an American actress who has been active in television and voice acting since the 1970s.

Career 
Britt's most notable animated work is for Filmation, voicing characters such as She-Ra, and the second animated Batgirl (Jane Webb was the first).  She also provided the voice for Penny, would-be love interest and aide to Plastic Man on The Plastic Man Comedy/Adventure Show, which was produced by Ruby-Spears. She was also the voice of Gran Gran in Avatar: The Last Airbender.

Her film credits include roles in Gray Lady Down (1978) and Being There (1979). On television she appeared in three different roles in three episodes of The Rockford Files, and on Cheers she played Kelly Gaines' mother, Roxanne Gaines, in the episode "Woody or Won't He".

Personal life 
Britt grew up in Houston, Texas. She has two daughters.

Filmography

Film

Television

References

External links
 Official site
 
 

1943 births
Living people
American film actresses
American television actresses
American video game actresses
American voice actresses
Actresses from Houston
Filmation people
Actresses from Charlotte, North Carolina
20th-century American actresses
21st-century American actresses